In geometry, Monsky's theorem states that it is not possible to dissect a square into an odd number of triangles of equal area.  In other words, a square does not have an odd equidissection.

The problem was posed by Fred Richman in the American Mathematical Monthly in 1965, and was proved by Paul Monsky in 1970.

Proof
Monsky's proof combines combinatorial and algebraic techniques, and in outline is as follows:

Take the square to be the unit square with vertices at (0,0), (0,1), (1,0) and (1,1). If there is a dissection into n triangles of equal area then the area of each triangle is 1/n.
Colour each point in the square with one of three colours, depending on the 2-adic valuation of its coordinates.
Show that a straight line can contain points of only two colours.
Use Sperner's lemma to show that every triangulation of the square into triangles meeting edge-to-edge must contain at least one triangle whose vertices have three different colours.
Conclude from the straight-line property that a tricolored triangle must also exist in every dissection of the square into triangles, not necessarily meeting edge-to-edge.
Use Cartesian geometry to show that the 2-adic valuation of the area of a triangle whose vertices have three different colours is greater than 1. So every dissection of the square into triangles must contain at least one triangle whose area has a 2-adic valuation greater than 1.
If n is odd then the 2-adic valuation of 1/n is 1, so it is impossible to dissect the square into triangles all of which have area 1/n.

Optimal dissections 

By Monsky's theorem it is necessary to have triangles with different areas to dissect a square into an odd number of triangles. Lower bounds for the area differences that must occur to dissect a square into an odd numbers of triangles and the optimal dissections have been studied.

Generalizations

The theorem can be generalized to higher dimensions: an n-dimensional hypercube can only be divided into simplices of equal volume, if the number of simplices is a multiple of n!.

References

Euclidean plane geometry
Theorems in discrete geometry
Geometric dissection